Howletts Wild Animal Park (formerly known as Howletts Zoo) in the parish of Bekesbourne, near Canterbury in Kent, was established as a private zoo in 1957 by John Aspinall. In 1962, the House known as Howletts was being restored. A small cottage was inhabited by an employee. The animal collection was opened to the public in 1975. To give more room for the animals another estate at Port Lympne near Hythe in Kent was purchased in 1973, and opened to the public as Port Lympne Zoo in 1976.

The collection is known for being unorthodox, for the encouragement of close personal relationships between staff and animals, and for the breeding of rare and endangered species. Steve Irwin visited the park in 2004 and described the zoo's gorillas as "the finest in the world".

Since 1984, both parks have been owned by the John Aspinall Foundation, a charity. Following his death, John Aspinall was buried in front of the Howletts House and a memorial was built next to the grave near the bison.
A later extension to Howletts was an open-topped enclosure for black and white colobus, just behind the entrance.

Animal collection 

The park is most famous for having some of the largest family groups of western lowland gorillas in the world. It is also home to the largest breeding herd of African elephants in the United Kingdom and has one of the largest breeding groups of lion-tailed macaques in the world.

Some of the animals in its collection include:
African bush elephant
African wild dog
Amur leopard
Black-and-white ruffed lemur
Black lemur
Brazilian tapir
Cape buffalo
Capybara
Celebes crested macaque'
Chital
Clouded leopard
Crowned lemur
De Brazza's monkey
Dhole
Dusky leaf monkey
Eastern black-and-white colobus monkey
Eastern black rhinoceros
Eastern bongo
Eurasian wolf
European bison
Fishing cat
François' langur
Gelada
Giant anteater
Greater kudu
Honey badger
Iberian wolf
Javan langur
Lion
Lion-tailed macaque
Margay
Nilgai
Pallas's cat
Red-bellied lemur
Red river hog
Ring-tailed lemur
Serval
Siamang
Silvery gibbon
Snow leopard
Sumatran tiger
Waterbuck
Western lowland gorilla
White-naped mangabey

Charity events
The charity that runs Howletts and Port Lympne Wild Animal Park, the John Aspinall Foundation, also runs animal conservation programmes. It has had recent success in releasing a black rhino into the wild and has previously released other black rhinos and gorillas.

Television
Howletts and Port Lympne have featured on the CBBC television programme Roar. This shows the two parks, the life of the animals and how the keepers look after them. The first series was filmed in 2006 and, as of March 2009, there have been four series in total.

Howletts House
Originally called Owletts, in the parish of Bekesbourne, the present house containing 30 rooms was built for Isaac Baugh in 1787 and replaced a previous house which had been the seat of the Isaac family until the reign of Queen Elizabeth I, later of the Hales family for several generations. It passed into the ownership of the Gipps family in 1816. It has been a Grade II* listed building and on the National Heritage List for England since January 1967. The house is presently let by the Aspinall Foundation to Damian Aspinall for £2,500 per month.

See also
Port Lympne Wild Animal Park

References

External links
Zoo website
Aspinall Foundation
  of Pallas' cat
 

Buildings and structures in Kent
City of Canterbury
Tourist attractions in Kent
Zoos in England